Haven Street, Causeway Bay, Hong Kong Island, Hong Kong  
Haven Street, Baltimore, Maryland, United States

See also
Havenstreet